The Boys' Singles tournament of the 2015 BWF World Junior Championships is held on November 10–15. The defending champion of the last edition is Lin Guipu from China.

Seeded

  Firman Abdul Kholik (Quarterfinals)
  Cheam June Wei (3rd round)
  Anders Antonsen (4th round)
  Lin Guipu (Quarterfinals)
  Kantawat Leelavechabutr (4th round)
  Lu Chia-hung (Champion)
  Toma Junior Popov (3rd round)
  Wolfgang Gnedt (3rd round)
  Kantaphon Wangcharoen (3rd round)
  Satheishtharan Ramachandran (Quarterfinals)
  Vincent Medina (4th round)
  Miha Ivanic (2nd round)
  Loh Kean Yew (Quarterfinals)
  Adulrach Namkul (Semifinals)
  Chirag Sen (4th round)
  Melih Turgut (2nd round)

Draw

Finals

Top Half

Section 1

Section 2

Section 3

Section 4

Bottom Half

Section 5

Section 6

Section 7

Section 8

References
Main Draw

2015 BWF World Junior Championships
2015 in youth sport